Hadi Riad Sharara (or Hady Sharara, Arabic: هادي شرارة, born 1969) is a Lebanese music arranger, composer and producer. He is the son of the famous Lebanese television anchor Riad Sharara and the husband of the famous Lebanese singer of Carole Sakr. 

He has also been the music producer of the Arabic versions of The X Factor and Dancing with the Stars.

He was subject to criticism when because of his statements during the "Menna w Jerr" episode by Pierre Rabbat on MTV, considering that the artist Maya Diab possesses the qualifications that his father Riad Sharara had, which prompted him to issue an explanation during which he declared his remorse for appearing in the program.

Biography 
Born in 1969 in a well-known family, he is the son of the great journalist Riad Sharara, who died in 1994 after a heart attack on stage. His mother is Renee Debs, and he has three brothers: Hanadi, Nadine and Ghadi.

He started his artistic journey with a Lebanese music band singing in English called ZED in 1986, and the band included the Lebanese singer Carole Sakr, who later became his wife; they are parents to Jean-Michel Zacca and Aghia–Maria Sharara. 

His unique style in producing music is known for its special fusion between the East & the West. This distinctiveness caused his name to be associated with the new generation of Top Hits & famous Arab singers such Wael Kfoury, Najwa Karam, Nancy Ajram, Ragheb Alama, Nawal Al Zoghbi, Maya Diab and many others.

In 2006, Hady Sharara won the Murex D'or Excellence Award as "Best Music Arranger". 

Hadi Sharara owns a music recording studio named Hadi Sharara Studio.

See also 

 Carole Sakr
 Riad Sharara
 Tarek Abou Jaoude
 Maya Diab

References 

Lebanese composers
1969 births
Living people